The Sarmiento Palace, commonly known as the Pizzurno Palace, is an architectural landmark in the Recoleta section of Buenos Aires and the location of the Argentine Ministry of Education.

Overview

A will left by a local heiress, Petronila Rodríguez de Rojas, stipulated that her roughly  lot in uptown Buenos Aires be used for an educational and charitable compound to include a church, an old-age asylum and a girls' school for no less than 700 pupils. Her 1882 death accordingly left the property to the city, which commissioned German Argentine architects Carlos Adolfo Altgelt and his cousin Hans Altgelt to design the requisite school.

Work began in 1886 on the building which, per Mrs. Rojas' wishes, would include extensive museum and library facilities, as well. The building's design was eclectic, inspired by Second Empire architecture influenced by both French and German Renaissance Revival architecture. It was completed in 1888, and the Petronila Rodríguez de Rojas School was inaugurated in 1893. The majestic landmark was soon earmarked for use as government offices, however, and the National Education Council was installed there in 1903; the National Education Council (since dissolved) administered Argentina's system of national secondary schools. The building was rebaptized as the Sarmiento Palace in honor of former Education Minister and President Domingo Sarmiento, who made "the education of a sovereign people" a policy centerpiece during his prosperous 1868-74 tenure.

The building's location facing leafy Rodríguez Peña Plaza created an urban oasis in the otherwise bustling Barrio Norte section of the upscale Recoleta ward. A lot immediately to the south of the building was converted into Petronila Rodríguez de Rojas Plaza (a playground) as a belated homage to the civic-minded lady during the 1950s (as was a primary school in the Parque Chas neighborhood, in 1934).

The last dictatorship, which dissolved the Education Council in 1978, transferred the Ministry of Education to the building in 1980. Still officially known as the Sarmiento Palace, the building is popularly known as the Pizzurno Palace for the side street built facing it, which was renamed in honor of pedagogian and local primary school system pioneer Pablo Pizzurno, following his death in 1940.

References

Education in Argentina
Libraries in Argentina
Palaces in Buenos Aires
Government buildings in Argentina
National Historic Monuments of Argentina
School buildings completed in 1888
Renaissance Revival architecture in Argentina